Tudor Parfitt (born 10 October 1944) is a British historian, writer, broadcaster, traveller and adventurer. He specialises in the study of Jewish communities around the world, particularly in Africa, Asia and the Americas. Some of these communities have been recognised only since the late 20th century as having ancient Jewish origins.

Parfitt is emeritus professor of modern Jewish studies in the University of London at the School of Oriental and African Studies (SOAS), where he was the founding director of the Centre for Jewish Studies. He is now senior associate fellow at the Oxford Centre for Hebrew and Jewish Studies. He is corresponding senior fellow of the Académie Royale des Sciences d’Outre-Mer, Koninklijke Academie voor Overzeese Wetenschappen, Belgium and is on the board as chair of the academic advisory committee of the Paris-based Projet Aladin and is on the Committee of Experts of the New York-based Global Hope Coalition. He is a Fellow of the Royal Historical Society in the United Kingdom. He was appointed distinguished professor at Florida International University in 2012 and distinguished university professor in 2018. He is alumni fellow at the Hutchins Center for African and African American Research at Harvard College. In 2011 he gave the Nathan Huggins Lectures at Harvard College, which were published by Harvard University Press.

Early life and education
Parfitt was born in Wales in 1944, the son of Vernon (a headmaster) and Margaret (Sears) Parfitt. He was educated at Loughborough Grammar School in Leicestershire, England. In 1963-4 he spent a gap year with Voluntary Service Overseas (VSO) in Jerusalem, where he worked with handicapped people, some of whom were Holocaust survivors. Upon his return to Britain, he studied Hebrew and Arabic at the University of Oxford and at the  Hebrew University of Jerusalem. In 1968 he was awarded the Goodenday Fellowship at the Hebrew University of Jerusalem. He completed a D.Phil. at Oxford with David Patterson and Albert Hourani, on the history of the Jews in Palestine and their relations with their Muslim neighbours. He expanded it for publication by the Royal Historical Society.

Academic career

In 1972 Parfitt was appointed lecturer in Hebrew language, literature and history at the University of Toronto, Canada. In 1974 he was appointed  Parkes Fellow at the Parkes Institute for the Study of Jewish/non-Jewish Relations at the University of Southampton in England. Shortly afterward, he took up a lectureship in Modern Hebrew at SOAS. His first body of work interrogated the nature of the revival of the Hebrew language.

Throughout the 1980s, Parfitt undertook covert lecture tours to Jewish Refusenik groups in the Soviet Union and Czechoslovakia. In 1985 he spent several months visiting the various Jewish communities of Asia - including Thailand, Hong Kong, Singapore and Japan. In Japan he interested the Emperor's brother, Prince Mikasa, in the Jewish communities of the East. In 1987 he was asked by the Jewish community of Singapore to write an official history of the island's Jews. That same year he visited Syria to write about the situation of its Jewish community for the Minority Rights Group. He was arrested by the Syrian secret police, the Mukhabarat, during his trip. He describes these events in his first travel book, The Thirteenth Gate.

In the early 1990s, Parfitt conducted fieldwork in Yemen, researching its ancient Jewish community, and wrote a book on the subject. In The Road to Redemption, he said that the Yemenite Jews had emigrated to Israel as a result of extreme prejudice, persecution, legal disabilities and because of the rapidly changing economy of the Indian Ocean region. He also researched and presented a BBC documentary called The Last Exile on this subject. In 2002 he published his Lost Tribes of Israel: the History of a Myth. One of his themes is that the creation of Israelite and Judaic identities throughout the world, from the Americas to Papua New Guinea, was an innate feature of Western colonialism. Constructing unknown peoples as Jews was an insidious means of controlling them. In addition such constructed identities served as a means of explaining a wide range of religious and cultural manifestations. In some cases the colonial effort was supported by the idea that indigenous cultures were descended from the Lost Tribes of Israel. His work on marginal Jewish communities and aspiring Jewish communities throughout the world led to his being consulted by a Knesset select committee which eventually argued that the State of Israel should formulate new policies to address the aspirations of these 'lost tribes'.

African Judaism 

In 1984 Parfitt was commissioned by the London-based Minority Rights Group to write a report on the Ethiopian Jews who had fled Ethiopia. They had migrated to escape persecution and famine, but were dying in large numbers in the refugee camps along the border between the Sudan and Ethiopia. His visits to the camps coincided with Israel's Operation Moses, which rescued thousands of Ethiopian Jews and took them to Israel. Parfitt's book on the operation Operation Moses was translated into many languages. He later was selected as the Vice-President of the Society for the Study of Ethiopian Jewry (SOSTEJE).

Subsequently, he turned his attention to another black and apparently Jewish group: the Lemba tribe of southern Africa. They claimed descent from some ancient Jewish population. He published Journey to the Vanished City (1992) about his six-month journey throughout Africa. In a subsequent edition he traced the origins of the tribe to the eastern end of the Hadhramaut in Yemen. There he discovered the ancient city of Sena and the possible origins of the tribe in some migrating Jewish traders. TV programs about the discoveries, and major newspaper coverage, brought Parfitt international attention. He was nicknamed the British 'Indiana Jones,' after the film character.

Seeking more data, in 1996 and later years Parfitt organised Y-DNA studies of Lemba males. These found a high proportion of paternal Semitic ancestry, DNA that is common to both Arabs and Jews from the Middle East. The work confirmed that the male line had descended from a few ancestors from southern Arabia. In recognition of this work, he was made corresponding fellow of the Académie Royale des Sciences d’Outre-Mer.

The Lemba have a tradition of having brought a drum, or ngoma, from the Middle East centuries ago. Parfitt noted that their description of the ngoma was similar to that of the Biblical Ark of the Covenant. He observed that rabbinic sources maintain that there were two Arks of the Covenant: one the ceremonial Ark, covered with gold, which was eventually placed in the Holy of Holies in the Temple; the other the Ark of War, which had been carved from wood by Moses and was a relatively simple object. Parfitt proposed that the Ark of War may have been taken by Jews across the Jordan River and, citing Islamic sources, suggests that they perhaps carried it as they migrated south, while under rule by Arab tribes. The Lemba claim to have brought their ark/ngoma from Arabia at some point in the past. In 2007, Parfitt discovered an object he claimed was an ancient copy of the original ngoma.

Parfitt wrote The Lost Ark of the Covenant: Solving the 2,500 Year Old Mystery of the Fabled Biblical Ark (2008), documenting his findings. Associated documentaries were aired on Channel Four and the History Channel. The BBC reported that the discovery of the ngoma "instilled pride among many of the Lemba". In 2010 Parfitt was invited to address a symposium in Harare on the subject; attendees included the cabinet and vice-president John Nkomo. The ngoma has been exhibited at the Zimbabwe Museum of Human Sciences.

Parfitt subsequently turned his interest to Jewish communities in India and the Pacific. His DNA work on the Bene Israel, the origins of whom were obscure, showed that they were descended from males from the Middle East, consistent with their oral histories of origin. These successes led other Judaising groups, including the Gogodala tribe of Papua New Guinea, to seek help in determining their own origins.

Other work 
Parfitt's pioneering work has contributed to the expanding study of the spread of Judaism and Judaising movements throughout the African continent.

Parfitt's other academic interests have been: the Sephardi/Mizrahi communities of the Muslim world, Jewish-Muslim relations, Hebrew and Hebrew Literature, Judaising movements, Jewish genetic identity and the discourses surrounding it, and Jews in Asia and Africa. He has published widely on the margins of the Jewish world. His most recent work is on the history of race as it affected blacks and Jews. His book on the history of race as it affects Jews and Blacks — Hybrid Hate: Conflations of Antisemitism & Anti-Black Racism from the Renaissance to the Third Reich — was published by Oxford University Press in 2020.

Parfitt has published over 100 articles and written, edited or translated 30 books which have been translated into fifteen languages.

Publications

Books 
Parfitt, T. (2020) Hybrid Hate: Conflations of Antisemitism & Anti-Black Racism from the Renaissance to the Third Reich, Oxford University Press
Parfitt, T., Miles W. and Lis D. eds. (2016) "The Shadow Of Moses: New Jewish Movements In Africa And The Diaspora", Africa World Press.
Parfitt, T. and Fisher N. (editor). (2016). "Joining the Jewish People: New Jews and Emerging Jewish Communities in a Globalised World", Cambridge Scholars’ Press.
Parfitt, T. (2014) and Fromm Annette B., "Gogodala: Transition and Revival" Patricia and Philip Frost Art Museum, Florida International University.
Parfitt, T. (2013) Miccolli D. and Trevisan-Semi, E., eds. Memory and Ethnicity: Ethnic Museums in Israel and the Diaspora, Cambridge Scholars’ Press
 Parfitt, T. (2013) Black Jews in Africa and the Americas, New York: Harvard University Press
 Parfitt, T. and E. Bruder. (2012) African Zion: Studies in Black Judaism, Cambridge Scholars' Press.
 Parfitt, T. (2008) The Lost Ark of the Covenant, London/New York: Harper Collins.
 Parfitt, T. and Egorova, Y. (2005) Genetics, Mass Media, and Identity: A Case Study of the Genetic Research on the Lemba and Bene Israel, London: Routledge.
 Parfitt, T and Trevisan-Semi, E., (2005) The Jews of Ethiopia: the birth of an élite. London: Routledge.
 Parfitt T. (2004) The Lost Tribes of Israel: the History of a Myth, London: Weidenfeld and Nicolson.
 Parfitt, T. and Egorova, Y., (2003) Jews, Muslims and Mass Media : Mediating the Other, London: Routledge Curzon.
 Parfitt, T. and Trevisan Semi, E. (2002) Judaising Movements: Studies in the Margins of Judaism, London: Routledge Curzon.
 Parfitt, T. (2000) Israel and Ishmael: Studies in Muslim-Jewish Relations, London: Curzon.
 Parfitt, T. and Trevisan-Semi, E., (1999) The Beta Israel in Ethiopia and Israel: Studies on the Ethiopian Jews, London: Curzon.
 Parfitt, T. (1996) The Road to Redemption: The Jews of the Yemen 1900–1950. Brill's Series in Jewish Studies vol. XVII. Leiden: Brill.
 Parfitt, T. and Abramson G., (1995) Jewish education and learning: published in honour of Dr. David Patterson on the occasion of his seventieth birthday. Chur, Switzerland: Harwood Academic Publishers.
Parfitt, T.,Kaplan, S. and Trevisan-Semi, E., (1995) Between Africa and Zion : proceedings of the First International Congress of the Society for the Study of Ethiopian Jewry. Jerusalem: Ben-Zvi Institute.
 Parfitt, T. and Trevisan-Semi, E., eds. (1993) L'altro Visto Dall'altro. Letteratura Araba ed Ebraica a Confronto, Milan: Cortina Libreria.
 Parfitt, T. (1992) Journey to the Vanished City: the Search for a Lost Tribe of Israel, New York: Random House.
 Parfitt, T. (1988) The Jews of Arab Countries and Iran, Zionist Federation of Great Britain and Ireland. 
 Parfitt, T. (1987) The Jews of Africa and Asia, London: Minority Rights Group
 Parfitt, T. (1987) The Thirteenth Gate : Travels among the Lost Tribes of Israel, London: Weidenfeld & Nicolson.
 Parfitt, T. (1987) The Jews in Palestine, 1800–1882, Royal Historical Society Studies in History (52). Woodbridge: Published for the Royal Historical Society by Boydell.
 Parfitt, T. (1985) Operation Moses: The Untold Story of the Secret Exodus of the Falasha Jews from Ethiopia, London : Weidenfeld and Nicolson.
 Parfitt, T. and Abramson, G., (1985) The Great transition : the recovery of the lost centres of modern Hebrew literature, Totowa, N.J.: Rowman & Allanheld.
 Parfitt, T. and Kessler D. (1985) The Falashas: the Jews of Ethiopia, London: Minority Rights Group.
 Parfitt, T. and Abramson G. (1983) Great tranquillity: questions and answers [Translation from the Hebrew of Yehuda Amichai's Shalvah gedolah]. New York: Harper & Row.

Documentaries 
 Parfitt, T. (2015) Tudor Parfitt and the Lost Tribes of Israel: (Secrets of the Bible: Season 1, Episode 5) Director Tim Gaunt   
 Parfitt, (2013) T. TED-X talk exploring Religion, Genetics and Identity 
Parfitt. T. (2013) The Lost Tribe PBS, WLRN channel 17 (about Parfitt's FIU Expedition to the Gogodala Tribe of Papua New Guinea): Director Tim Long
 Parfitt, T. (2012) "The Black Jews of South Africa and the Lost Ark of the Covenant". (Issues of Faith) Director Eugene Botha. SABC.
 Parfitt, T. (2008) Quest for the Lost Ark. Director Martin Kemp. Channel Four/ History Channel
 Parfitt, T. (1999) To the Ends of the Earth: Search for the Sons of Abraham. Director Chris Hale. Channel Four / NOVA
 Parfitt, T. (1993) The Longest Exile, BBC Producer Julian Hale
 Parfitt, T. (1992) King Solomon’s Tribe, BBC Producer Julian Hale
 Parfitt, T. (1988) The Twice Promised Land, Three-part documentary to mark the 40th anniversary of the State of Israel, BBC, Producer Steve Sackur

References

External links 
 Nova Program on Tudor Parfitt's Remarkable Journey

British anthropologists
1944 births
Welsh Africanists
Historians of Africa
Historians of Jews and Judaism
Living people
People educated at Loughborough Grammar School
Alumni of the University of Oxford
Academics of SOAS University of London
Academic staff of the University of Toronto
Academics of the University of Southampton
People associated with The Institute for Cultural Research
Fellows of the Royal Historical Society